Pierre Vatin (born 21 August 1967) is a French Republican politician who has represented Oise's 5th constituency in the National Assembly since 2017.

Career 
Vatin was parliamentary assistant to Lucien Degauchy for 21 years. When Degauchy stood down from Parliament, Vatin obtained the nomination of the Republican Party for the 2017 election. After a difficult first round Vatin won the constituency in the second round, with 55.96% of the vote, in the second round against the En Marche candidate, Emmanuelle Bour.

References

External links 
 Official page at the National Assembly

Living people
1967 births
People from Saint-Quentin, Aisne
People from Oise
20th-century French politicians
21st-century French politicians
The Republicans (France) politicians
Deputies of the 15th National Assembly of the French Fifth Republic
Deputies of the 16th National Assembly of the French Fifth Republic